Emil Haladej (born 25 September 1997) is a Slovak professional footballer who plays for Inter Bratislava on loan from Prešov.

Club career

1. FC Tatran Prešov
Haladej made his professional Fortuna Liga debut for 1. FC Tatran Prešov against ŠK Slovan Bratislava on 19 February 2017.

In 2019, Haladej was loaned out to FK Inter Bratislava until the summer.

References

External links
 1. FC Tatran Prešov official club profile
 ]
 Futbalnet profile

1997 births
Living people
Slovak footballers
Association football defenders
1. FC Tatran Prešov players
Partizán Bardejov players
FK Inter Bratislava players
Slovak Super Liga players
2. Liga (Slovakia) players